The 1991 430 km of Silverstone was the third round of the 1991 World Sportscar Championship season, taking place at Silverstone Circuit, United Kingdom.  It took place on 19 May 1991.

Official results
Class winners in bold.  Cars failing to complete 90% of the winner's distance marked as Not Classified (NC).

Statistics
 Pole Position - Martin Brundle (#4 Silk Cut Jaguar) - 1:27.478
 Fastest Lap - Martin Brundle (#3 Silk Cut Jaguar) - 1:29.372
 Average Speed - 196.413 km/h

NB: Martin Brundle took the pole on #4 car (chassis-Nr 691) and made the best lap on #3 car (chassis-Nr 591). He raced only the #3 car being the solo driver.

External links
 WSPR-Racing - 1991 Silverstone results

Silverstone
6 Hours of Silverstone
Silverstone